The Hoosier Grand Prix was a sports car, Formula Libre, and Champ Car race held at Indianapolis Raceway Park between 1961 and 1994.  The race began as a round of the USAC Road Racing Championship.  After being run for sports cars in its first year, the race switched to Formula Libre for the next two.  After not being held in 1964, the race shifted to the USAC National Championship Trail for Champ Cars in 1965, running until 1970.  The IMSA GT Championship revived the race in 1973, and again in 1994.

Results

External links
Racing Sports Cars: IRP archive
Champ Car Stats: IRP archive

IMSA GT Championship races
American open wheel series races
Motorsport in Indianapolis
Sports car races